The 2022 Vuelta a Andalucía Ruta del Sol (English: Tour of Andalucia Route of the Sun) was a road cycling stage race that took place between 16 and 20 February 2022 in the autonomous community of Andalusia in southern Spain. The race was rated as a category 2.Pro event on the 2022 UCI ProSeries calendar, and was the 68th edition of the Vuelta a Andalucía.

After the 2021 edition was postponed to May due to the COVID-19 pandemic in Spain, the race returned to its traditional mid-February timeslot.

Teams 
12 of the 18 UCI WorldTeams and ten UCI ProTeams made up the 22 teams that participated in the race. Only 14 teams entered a full squad of seven riders each. Four teams entered six riders each, and three teams entered five riders each, while  was the only team to enter four riders. , with one non-starter, was reduced to six riders. In total, 140 riders started the race, of which 108 finished.

Before stage 3,  and  both withdrew from the race after returning multiple positive COVID-19 test results.

UCI WorldTeams

 
 
 
 
 
 
 
 
 
 
 
 

UCI ProTeams

Route

Stages

Stage 1 
16 February 2022 – Ubrique to Iznájar,

Stage 2 
17 February 2022 – Archidona to Alcalá la Real,

Stage 3 
18 February 2022 – Lucena to Otura,

Stage 4 
19 February 2022 – Cúllar Vega to Baza,

Stage 5 
20 February 2022 – Huesa to Chiclana de Segura,

Classification leadership table 

 On stage 2, Ander Okamika, who was third in the points classification, wore the green jersey, because first-placed Rune Herregodts wore the yellow jersey as the leader of the general classification, and second-placed Stephen Bassett wore the blue jersey as the leader of the sprints classification.
 On stage 3, Rune Herregodts, who was second in the points classification, wore the green jersey, because first-placed Alessandro Covi wore the yellow jersey as the leader of the general classification. For the same reason, Simon Clarke wore the green jersey on stage 4.

Final classification standings

General classification

Points classification

Mountains classification

Sprints classification

Andalusian rider classification

Spanish rider classification

Combined classification

Team classification

References

Sources

External links 
 

2022
Vuelta a Andalucía
Vuelta a Andalucía
Vuelta a Andalucía
2020s in Andalusia